Social viewing (also known as Watch Party or GroupWatch) describes a recently developed practice revolving around the ability for multiple users to aggregate from multiple sources and view online videos together in a synchronized viewing experience.

Typically the experience also involves some form of instant messaging or communication to facilitate discussion pertaining to the common viewing experience.

History
The term in this context originated with the Toronto and Los Angeles-based company View2Gether which has created proprietary technology for aggregating content from sources not controlled by the user for synchronized play and inclusion in common playlists by multiple participants with a commensurate instant messaging chat function. Other sites which provide similar functionality include Oortle (Photophlow), SeeToo and development of social viewing for existing portals such as Yahoo have recently been announced.

The term has been used in some cases to describe online viewing within the framework of a social network, however View2gether and similar sites have reconfigured the term to mean a common viewing experience as a social activity.

Social viewing has also been used in the past to describe activities such as gathering for the viewing of particular television programs, such as soap operas.

Some examples of modern social viewing sites include Twitch, YouTube, Facebook, TikTok, Instagram, Zoom, and Twitter.

It was also officially added as a built-in feature in some over-the-top media services in various names. While Amazon and Hulu both call it Watch Party, Disney+ (which offers it only in some countries) calls it GroupWatch.

Social viewing experience 
Nowadays we can watch a video while interacting with other people thanks to social viewing and all the resources that it provide us. We can watch a movie while chatting with our friends or discus about a concrete scene. One factor to improve could be the synchronization between users, to be sure that everyone is watching the same scene, so that no problem arises while discussing it.

Notes and references

External links
 How to Host a Virtual Watch Party September 29, 2020 Wired article by Boone Ashworth

Technology in society
Video on demand